Born on the Wrong Planet is the 1997 debut album of The String Cheese Incident.

Track listing
"Black Clouds" (Bill Nershi) - 4:23
"Born On The Wrong Planet" (Bill Nershi) - 4:57
"Land's End" (Tim O'Brien) - 5:19
"The Remington Ride" (Hank Penny, Herb Remington) - 4:10
"Résumé Man" (Keith Moseley) - 3:46
"Elvis' Wild Ride" (Bill Nershi) - 4:29
"Bigger Isn't Better" (Bill Nershi) - 6:32
"Johnny Cash" (String Cheese Incident) - 6:06
"Lester Had A Coconut" (Jack Rajca) - 4:25
"Diggin' In" (Michael Travis) - 2:34
"Texas" (Bill Nershi) - 8:46
"Jellyfish" (Bill Nershi) - 5:25

Credits

The String Cheese Incident 

 Bill Nershi – acoustic guitar, vocals
 Keith Moseley – Bass guitar, vocals
 Michael Kang – Mandolin, Violin
 Michael Travis – percussion, Conga, drums, vocals, Multi Instruments

Additional personnel
Tony Furtado - Banjo, Dojo
Paul Armstrong - Hammond Organ
Liza Oxnard - vocals
Jamie Janover - bongos, vocals, Multi Instruments, didgeridoo
Maya Dorn - Flute, vocals
Stacey Ludlow - vocals, Multi Instruments, Flig Dig

Production
Steve McNamara - Mastering
The String Cheese Incident -Producer
Jamie Janover - Contributor
Ron Miller - Artwork, Paintings
Christian Dicharry - Graphic Design
Stacey Ludlow - Contributor

References

The String Cheese Incident albums
1997 debut albums